Pteroxanium is a genus of scaly-winged barklice in the family Lepidopsocidae. There are about eight described species in Pteroxanium.

Species
These eight species belong to the genus Pteroxanium:
 Pteroxanium evansi Smithers, Courtenay & Thornton, 1974 c g
 Pteroxanium forcepetum Garcia Aldrete, 1984 c g
 Pteroxanium funebre Badonnel, 1963 c g
 Pteroxanium insularum Smithers, Courtenay & Thornton, 1974 c g
 Pteroxanium kelloggi (Ribaga, 1905) i c g b
 Pteroxanium marrisi Smithers, Courtenay, 2000 c g
 Pteroxanium oaxacanum Garcia Aldrete, 1985 c g
 Pteroxanium ralstonae Smithers, Courtenay & Thornton, 1974 c g
Data sources: i = ITIS, c = Catalogue of Life, g = GBIF, b = Bugguide.net

References

Further reading

 

Trogiomorpha